Ductilodon is an extinct genus of lepospondyl amphibian in the family Diplocaulidae. The type and only species Ductilodon pruitti was named in 1999 from the Early Permian of Kansas. Distinguishing features of Ductilodon include horns that project backward from the skull and an arched row of teeth on the palate. Ductilodon is most closely related to the diplocaulids Diplocaulus and Diploceraspis.

References

Cisuralian amphibians of North America
Fossil taxa described in 1999